Crazy Enough is the third studio album by Canadian country music artist Bobby Wills. It was released on June 24, 2014 via MDM Recordings and distributed by Universal Music Canada. The album includes the singles "Crazy Enough" and "Never Didn't Love You".

Critical reception
Shenieka Russell-Metcalf of Top Country gave the album five stars out of five, calling it "the definition of great country music" and writing that "his voice, range and lyrical versatility is the real deal."

Track listing

Chart performance

Singles

References

External links

2014 albums
Bobby Wills albums
MDM Recordings albums